The 2014 World Men's Curling Championship was held from March 29 to April 6 at the Capital Indoor Stadium in Beijing, China.

Norway's Thomas Ulsrud defeated Sweden's Oskar Eriksson in the final with a score of 8–3, securing his first world title and the fourth world title overall for Norway.

Qualification
The following nations qualified to participate in the 2014 World Men's Curling Championship:
 (host country)
Two teams from the Americas zone

 (given that no challenges in the Americas zone are issued)
Eight teams from the 2013 European Curling Championships

One team from the 2013 Pacific-Asia Curling Championships

Teams

Round-robin standings
Final round-robin standings

Round-robin results

Draw 1
Saturday, March 29, 14:00

Draw 2
Saturday, March 29, 19:00

Draw 3
Sunday, March 30, 9:00

Draw 4
Sunday, March 30, 14:00

Draw 5
Sunday, March 30, 19:00

Draw 6
Monday, March 31, 9:00

Draw 7
Monday, March 31, 14:00

Draw 8
Monday, March 31, 19:00

Draw 9
Tuesday, April 1, 9:00

Draw 10
Tuesday, April 1, 14:00

Draw 11
Tuesday, April 1, 19:00

Draw 12
Wednesday, April 2, 9:00

Draw 13
Wednesday, April 2, 14:00

Draw 14
Wednesday, April 2, 19:00

Draw 15
Thursday, April 3, 9:00

Draw 16
Thursday, April 3, 14:00

Draw 17
Thursday, April 3, 19:00

Tiebreaker
Friday, April 4, 9:00

Playoffs

1 vs. 2
Saturday, April 5, 11:00

3 vs. 4
Friday, April 4, 19:00

Semifinal
Saturday, April 5, 16:00

Bronze medal game
Sunday, April 6, 10:00

Final
Sunday, April 6, 15:00

Statistics

Top 5 player percentages
Round robin only

References
General

Specific

External links

World Men's Championship
World Men's Curling Championship
Sports competitions in Beijing
World Men's Curling Championship
World Men's Curling Championship, 2014
World Men's Curling Championship
World Men's Curling Championship
International curling competitions hosted by China